Eric Sione (born 29 October 1992) is a New Zealand rugby union footballer who plays as a prop.  His impressive performances for the Wellington Lions in the ITM Cup saw him named in the  squad for the 2013 Super Rugby season.

Sione was a member of the New Zealand Under 20 team which competed in the 2012 IRB Junior World Championship in South Africa.

References

External links 
itsrugby.co.uk profile

Living people
1992 births
New Zealand rugby union players
Rugby union props
Wellington rugby union players
People educated at St. Patrick's College, Wellington